The Piper Aerostar (formerly Ted Smith Aerostar) is an American twin-engined propeller-driven executive or light transport aircraft, designed by Ted R. Smith. It was originally built by Ted Smith Aircraft Company, which after 1978 became part of the Piper Aircraft Corporation.

Design and development
Ted Smith flew the first Aerostar 600 in October 1967. It was a mid-wing cantilever monoplane powered by two wing-mounted Avco Lycoming piston engines, with a tricycle landing gear. It was fitted with luxury accommodation for six. Also produced, and the base of most of the subsequent models, was a version with turbocharged engines, the Aerostar 601.

During the time of production, the Aerostar held the speed record for fastest twin piston general aviation aircraft, capable of cruise speeds from 220 kn (408 km/h) for the earliest 600 models to 261 kn (483 km/h) for the later 700 models. Light construction, low drag and high powered engines also contribute to fast climb rates.

Operational history
The aircraft were originally built at Van Nuys California, when in 1968 the company was bought by the American Cement Company. The acquisition was not a success, and in 1969 the company was sold again to Butler Aviation, owners of Mooney Airplane Company. The new company was named Aerostar Aircraft Corporation, and it was intended to move production to a Mooney plant at Kerrville, Texas. In 1971, Smith attempted to purchase the rights and announced he would be building an all-new design that was better than the Aerostar, but initial deals broke down. In 1972, Ted Smith bought back all the rights to the aircraft and continued to manufacture Aerostars in Santa Maria, California. He also introduced the pressurized Aerostar 601P. The 601P had engines with higher-rate turbochargers to feed a cabin pressurization system. Another variant was the Aerostar 700 Superstar. In 1976, the company name was changed to the Ted Smith Aerostar Corporation. Ted Smith died in 1976.

In 1978, the company was taken over by the Piper Aircraft Corporation. It continued to build two variants (600A and 601B) and then re-introduced the 601P and 602P.  After discontinuing production of the non-pressurised models, Piper moved production to Vero Beach Florida. The Aerostar was last built there in 1984.

The Aerostar type certificate and manufacturing documentation were sold in 1991 to Jim Christy and Steve Speer, who had been part of the Ted Smith Aerostar operation, and now operate Aerostar Aircraft Corporation in Hayden Lake, Idaho, providing maintenance and support of the aircraft and new R&D of its family of aircraft. Conceived with a jet-powered design structure by Ted Smith from the very beginning, the Aerostar Aircraft Corporation continued its R&D and finally completed Ted Smith's dream to convert the design into a twin fan-jet aircraft, with 6 seats (including one pilot) and its version of the 8-seat stretched variant.

Variants
Model 360
First prototype, powered by two  Lycoming IO-360 engines. First flew in November 1966.
Model 400
Modification of first prototype with  IO-360 engines.

Initial production model with two 290hp Lycoming IO-540-K engines, 282 produced under four different company names.
600A
Model 600 with some minor detail changes.
600E
Designation used for aircraft sold in Europe.
601 (later PA-61) This aircraft still holds the land closed speed record for a production piston twin
Model 600 with turbocharged engines, 117 built.
601B (later PA-61)
Model 601 with increased wingspan, 44 built.
601P (later PA-61P)
Pressurised version of the 601 with increased gross weight, 492 built
602P Sequoia (later PA-60)
Piper developed version of the 601P with the 290 hp Lycoming TIO-540-AA1A5 engines, 124 built.
621
The prototype pressurized Aerostar with 310 hp TIO-540 engines, one built ( at Van Nuys in mid-1969 ).
700 Superstar
Prototype of stretched fuselage variant with two IO-540M engines.
700P
602P with counter-rotating Lycoming TIO-540-U2A engines, 26 built, also designated the PA-60
702P
New modification of 700P with a reinforced nose gear allowing for higher takeoff weight
800
601P with stretched fuselage, enlarged tail and two 400 hp Lycoming engines, one built.
Speedstar 850
A modification to replace the twin piston engines with a single nose mounted turboprop.

Specifications (700P)

References

Notes

Bibliography
 The Illustrated Encyclopedia of Aircraft (Part Work 1982–1985), 1985, Orbis Publishing
 Michell, Simon. Jane's Civil and Military Aircraft Upgrades 1994–95. Coulsdon, UK:Jane's Information Group, 1994. .
 Simpson, R.W. Airlife's General Aviation, 1991, Airlife Publishing, 
 Taylor, John W. R. Jane's All The World's Aircraft 1967–68. London: Sampson Low, Marston & Company, 1967.

External links
 

1960s United States civil utility aircraft
Aerostar
Mid-wing aircraft
Aircraft first flown in 1967
Twin piston-engined tractor aircraft